Glasgow Kelvin was a parliamentary constituency represented in the House of Commons of the Parliament of the United Kingdom from 1997 until 2005. The area it represented is now covered by  Glasgow Central, Glasgow North and Glasgow North West.

It elected one Member of Parliament (MP) using the first-past-the-post voting system.

Boundaries
The City of Glasgow District electoral divisions of Anderston/City, Hyndland/Hillhead, and Scotstoun/Broomhill.

The constituency included Glasgow city centre.

Members of Parliament

Election results

Elections of the 2000s

Elections of the 1990s

References

Historic parliamentary constituencies in Scotland (Westminster)
Constituencies of the Parliament of the United Kingdom established in 1997
Constituencies of the Parliament of the United Kingdom disestablished in 2005
Politics of Glasgow
Partick
Hillhead